The LKL Slam Dunk Contest was an annual Lithuanian Basketball League (LKL) competition, that was originally held during the LKL All-Star Day, and later during the King Mindaugas Cup. The contest has been held almost every year, from the first All-Star Day.

History
Throughout the history of the contest, there have been witnessed many famous moments. Most noticeable being the 2001 contest, in Kaunas, where Robertas Javtokas (representing Lietuvos rytas) repeated the World Record for the highest slam dunk, when he dunked a basketball on a goal set at 3.65m (12 feet) above the floor.

The very first slam dunk contest was won by Gary Arrington, of BC Statyba, at the 1994 LKL All-Star Day, in Panevėžys. The current champion of the LKL Dunk Contest is Kenny Gaines.

Slam Dunk Contest champions

See also
LKL All-Star Game
LKL All-Star Day
LKL All-Star Game MVP
LKL Three-point Shootout

References 

Lietuvos krepšinio lyga All-Star Game
Recurring sporting events established in 1994
Sports entertainment